The 2020 WNBA season was the 24th season for the New York Liberty franchise of the WNBA. The Liberty opened the regular season on July 25, 2020 versus the Seattle Storm.

During the off-season the Liberty announced that they would return to the Barclays Center in Brooklyn as their permanent home. In the 2018 and 2019 seasons, the Liberty's primary home venue was the Westchester County Center in White Plains, New York.  Additionally, the Liberty announced that Walt Hopkins would replace Katie Smith as head coach.

This WNBA season will feature an all-time high 36 regular-season games. However, the plan for expanded games was put on hold on April 3, when the WNBA postponed its season due to the COVID-19 pandemic. Under a plan approved on June 15, the league is scheduled to hold a shortened 22-game regular season at IMG Academy, without fans present, starting on July 24.

The Liberty's shortened season started slowly, when they lost their first five games.  Their first win came on August 7, but was followed by another seven straight losses.  An eight game losing streak saw the team finish 2–20 for the season.  Number one overall draft pick Sabrina Ionescu only played in three games for the Liberty.  Their .091 winning percentage was the worst in team history.

Transactions

WNBA Draft

Trades/Roster Changes

Current roster

Game log

Regular season

|- style="background:#fcc;"
| 1
| July 25
| Seattle Storm
| L 71–87
| Clarendon (20)
| Stokes (9)
| Ionescu (4)
| IMG Academy0
| 0–1
|- style="background:#fcc;"
| 2
| July 29
| Dallas Wings
| L 80–93
| Ionescu (33)
| Zahui B. (11)
| Ionescu (7)
| IMG Academy0
| 0–2
|- style="background:#fcc;"
| 3
| July 31
| Atlanta Dream
| L 78–84
| Jones (20)
| Stokes (7)
| Clarendon (5)
| IMG Academy0
| 0–3

|- style="background:#fcc;"
| 4
| August 2
| Phoenix Mercury
| L 67–96
| Nurse (17)
| Zahui B. (9)
| Tied (4)
| IMG Academy0
| 0–4
|- style="background:#fcc;"
| 5
| August 5
| Minnesota Lynx
| L 66–92
| Zahui B. (13)
| Stokes (8)
| Clarendon (6)
| IMG Academy0
| 0–5
|- style="background:#bbffbb;"
| 6
| August 7
| Washington Mystics
| W 74–66
| Nurse (17)
| Zahui B. (14)
| Clarendon (6)
| IMG Academy0
| 1–5
|- style="background:#fcc;"
| 7
| August 9
| Las Vegas Aces
| L 76–78
| Zahui B. (20)
| Stokes (12)
| Clarendon (8)
| IMG Academy0
| 1–6
|- style="background:#fcc;"
| 8
| August 11
| Los Angeles Sparks
| L 78–93
| Jones (24)
| Zahui B. (10)
| Clarendon (5)
| IMG Academy0
| 1–7
|- style="background:#fcc;"
| 9
| August 13
| Indiana Fever
| L 79–86
| Nurse (21)
| Stokes (8)
| Tied (3)
| IMG Academy0
| 1–8
|- style="background:#fcc;"
| 10
| August 15
| Minnesota Lynx
| L 64–94
| Jones (13)
| Zahui B. (8)
| Nurse (3)
| IMG Academy0
| 1–9
|- style="background:#fcc;"
| 11
| August 18
| Seattle Storm
| L 64–105
| Nurse (21)
| Tied (6)
| 3 tied (2)
| IMG Academy0
| 1–10
|- style="background:#fcc;"
| 12
| August 20
| Chicago Sky
| L 85–101
| Jones (18)
| Stokes (9)
| Clarendon (5)
| IMG Academy0
| 1–11
|- style="background:#fcc;"
| 13
| August 22
| Connecticut Sun
| L 65–82
| Nurse (17)
| Zahui B. (10)
| Tied (5)
| IMG Academy0
| 1–12
|- style="background:#bbffbb;"
| 14
| August 25
| Chicago Sky
| W 101–99
| Zahui B. (22)
| Zahui B. (12)
| Clarendon (5)
| IMG Academy0
| 2–12
|- style="background:#fcc;"
| 15
| August 29
| Las Vegas Aces
| L 63–80
| Key (14)
| Zahui B. (21)
| Clarendon (4)
| IMG Academy0
| 2–13

|- style="background:#fcc;"
| 16
| September 1
| Connecticut Sun
| L 65–70
| Nurse (18)
| Zahui B. (10)
| Tied (3)
| IMG Academy0
| 2–14
|- style="background:#fcc;"
| 17
| September 3
| Atlanta Dream
| L 56–62
| Tied (12)
| Zahui B. (11)
| Zahui B. (3)
| IMG Academy0
| 2–15
|- style="background:#fcc;"
| 18
| September 5
| Phoenix Mercury
| L 67–83
| Holmes (13)
| Holmes (13)
| Clarendon (3)
| IMG Academy0
| 2–16
|- style="background:#fcc;"
| 19
| September 8
| Los Angeles Sparks
| L 70–96
| Willoughby (21)
| Stokes (8)
| Clarendon (5)
| IMG Academy0
| 2–17
|- style="background:#fcc;"
| 20
| September 10
| Indiana Fever
| L 75–85
| Kea (21)
| Jones (10)
| Tied (4)
| IMG Academy0
| 2–18
|- style="background:#fcc;"
| 21
| September 12
| Washington Mystics
| L 58–75
| Tied (15)
| Tied (7)
| Jones (6)
| IMG Academy0
| 2–19
|- style="background:#fcc;"
| 22
| September 13
| Dallas Wings
| L 79–82
| Jones (21)
| Zahui B. (10)
| Nurse (7)
| IMG Academy0
| 2–20

Awards and honors

Standings

Statistics

Source:

Regular season

References

External links
The Official Site of the New York Liberty

New York Liberty seasons
New York Liberty